Xavier Malisse (born 19 July 1980) is a Belgian former professional tennis player. Born in the north-western Flemish city of Kortrijk and nicknamed X-Man, he is one of only two Belgian men (the other being David Goffin) to have been ranked in the top 20 of the ATP Tour, with a career-high singles ranking of world No. 19.

Career

Juniors
As a junior Malisse compiled a singles win–loss record of 66–18, reaching as high as No. 10 in the junior world singles rankings in 1997. He made the quarterfinals of Wimbledon in 1997, whilst his final junior tournament was winning Eddie Herr later that year.

1998–2008
Malisse turned professional in 1998.

His best performance in Grand Slam singles competition was at the 2002 Wimbledon championships, where he reached the semi-final, beating Galo Blanco, Vince Spadea, Yevgeny Kafelnikov and Britain's Greg Rusedski in five sets en route, as well as former champion Richard Krajicek. He eventually lost to runner-up David Nalbandian, again in five sets.
Malisse and Olivier Rochus won the French Open doubles championship in 2004. 
He has won three ATP tour singles titles: Delray Beach in 2005 and 2007, and Chennai in 2007.

2009
After a difficult year, Malisse found himself with a world ranking of 205. In his first tournament of the year in Brisbane, he lost in the last qualifying round to American Bobby Reynolds. A week later, in Medibank International Sydney, he reached the main draw, but lost to Mario Ančić in the first round.

At the Australian Open, he first won his qualifying matches. In the first round of the main draw, he defeated Michaël Llodra. However, in the next round, he lost to Andy Roddick in four sets. In October, he won a Challenger tournament in Lyon, and this pushed him back into the world's top 100 for the first time in nearly two years.

He was banned for a year over doping allegations.

2010
Malisse lost in the third round of Wimbledon to Sam Querrey in five sets.

2011
Xavier started the 2011 season by reaching the final of Chennai. 
In March, he won the doubles title in the Indian Wells Masters with Alexandr Dolgopolov of Ukraine. He reached the fourth round at Wimbledon, where he lost to Bernard Tomic.

2012
Xavier reached the fourth round of Wimbledon where he faced Roger Federer. Federer won the first two sets and went a break up in the third, but Malisse came back to win the third set and move 2–0 in the fourth. Federer subsequently won six out of the next seven games to win the match and went on to win the Title.

2016–2018
After retiring in 2013 and competing in an ITF doubles event in 2015, Malisse entered the 2016 Meerbusch Challenger in doubles, ultimately conceding a walkover to end his playing career. He then participated in the ATP Champions Tour until 2018.

2021–2022 
Malisse came out of retirement to play doubles at the 2021 European Open having received a wildcard alongside Lloyd Harris whom he was coaching. The pair made the semifinals defeating top seeds Ivan Dodig and Marcelo Melo en route before losing to 3rd seeds Jean-Julien Rojer and Wesley Koolhof in straight sets. 

He also participated in the 2022 European Open having received again a wildcard to play doubles with Diego Schwartzman. In the first round they managed to beat Raven Klaasen and Marcelo Melo in straight sets. In the quarterfinals, they lost to Botic van de Zandschulp and Tallon Griekspoor in two tie-breaks.

Significant finals

Grand Slam finals

Doubles: 1 (1–0)

Masters 1000 finals

Doubles: 1 (1–0)

ATP career finals

Singles: 12 (3 titles, 9 runners-up)

Doubles: 13 (9 titles, 4 runners-up)

ATP Challenger and ITF Futures finals

Singles: 7 (4–3)

Doubles: 4 (2–2)

Performance timelines

Singles

Doubles

Top 10 wins

References

External links

 
 
 

1980 births
Belgian expatriates in the United States
Belgian male tennis players
Doping cases in tennis
French Open champions
Hopman Cup competitors
Living people
Olympic tennis players of Belgium
Sportspeople from Kortrijk
Sportspeople from Sarasota, Florida
Tennis people from Florida
Tennis players at the 2004 Summer Olympics
Grand Slam (tennis) champions in men's doubles